The discography of British musician Chris Rea consists of 25 studio albums, 14 compilation albums, 1 live album, 1 soundtrack album and 72 singles - including 32 UK top 75 hit singles. He has fourteen UK top 20 albums, nine of them in the Top 10, including two No. 1s.

Discography

Studio albums

Live albums

Compilation albums

Soundtrack albums

Singles

Videography

Video albums 
 Stony Road (2002)
 Dancing Down the Stony Road (2003)
 The Road to Hell & Back (The Farewell Tour) (2006)

References 

Discographies of British artists
Blues discographies
Rock music discographies